This is a list of aircraft engine manufacturers both past and present.

0–9

 2si – US
 3W

A

 A.V. Roe
 Abadal
 ABC Motors — UK
 ABECO
 Aberg
 ABLE
 ACAE
 Accurate Automation Corp
 Adams
 Adams-Dorman
 Adams-Farwell
 Adept-Airmotive
 Adler
 Admiralty Rotary
 Adorjan & Dedics
 Advance Engines
 Advance Motor Manufacturing Company – UK
 Advanced Engine Design
 Aeolus Flugmotor
 Aerien CC
 Aermacchi
 Aero & Marine
 Aero Adventure
 Aero Bonner Ltd.
 Aero Conversions Inc.
 Aero Development
 Aero Engines Ltd.
 AIDC
 Aero Motion
 Aero Motors
 Aero Pixie
 Aero Prag
 Aero Sled
 Aero Sport International
 Aero Sport Power
 Aero Thrust
 Aero Turbines Ltd
 AeroTwin Motors Corporation
 AeroConversions
 Aerodaimler
 Aeroengine Corporation of China (AECC) — China
 Aerojet — US
 Aeromarine Company
 Aeromarine — US
 Aeromax
 Aeromotion
 Aeronamic
 Aeronautical Products Corporation
 Aeronca — US
 Aeronco
 Aeroplane Motors Company
 Aeroprotech
 Aerosila — Russia
 Aerosport – US
 Aerostar – Romania
 Aerosud-Marvol
 Aerotech-PL
 Aerotechnik
 Aerotek – US
 Aerotwin
 Aerovee
 AFECO
 Affordable Turbine Power
 AFR
 Agilis
 Agusta – Italy
 Ahrbecker Son and Hankers
 Aichi Kokuki – Japan
 AICTA Design Work
 Aiello
 Air Cooled Motors – US
 Air Repair Incorporated
 Air Ryder
 Air Technical Arsenal
 Airtrike
 Air-Craft Engine Corp
 Aircat
 Aircraft & Ind. Motor Corp.
 ACT
 AEADC
 Airculture
 Airdelta
 Airdisco — UK
 AiResearch
 Airex
 Airmotive-Perito
 Airship
 Airways Mfg.
 AISA
 Aixro
 Ajax
 Akkerman
 Akron
 AKSAI
 Albatross
 Aldasoro
 Alexander (engine manufacturer)
 Alfa Romeo — Italy
 Alfaro
 ABEC
 Allen Aircraft Engine Co — US
 Alliance Aircraft Corp 
 Allied Aviation Corp
 AlliedSignal — US
 Allis-Chalmers
 Allison Engine Company — US
 Alvis — UK
 ACE
 AEC
 American Helicopter
 American
 Angle
 Antoinette — France
 Anzani
 Ardem
 Argus Motoren — Germany
 Armstrong Siddeley — UK
 Arrow Aircraft and Motors
 Arrow SNC — Italy
 Arsenal
 Ashmusen
 Aspin
 Aster
 Astra Avioane Arad – Romania
 Atwood
 Aubier & Dunne
 Austro Engine — Austria
 Austro-Daimler — Austria
 Avia Narodny Podnik 
 Avia — Czechoslovakia
 Aviadvigatel – Russia
 Avio – Italy
 Avro Canada
 Avro
 Axelson
 Axial Vector Engine Corporation (Dyna-Cam)

B

 Basse und Selve
 Bates
 Beardmore
 Beardmore-Halford-Pullinger (B.H.P.)
 Beatty
 Bailey Aviation
 Bentley
 Benz
 Berliner
 Besler Brothers
 Blackburn
 Blackburne
 BMW
 Boeing
 Borzecki
 Botali
 Bramo
 Brandner
 Breguet-Bugatti
 Breitfeld & Danek
 Breuer
 King
 Briggs & Stratton
 Bristol Siddeley
 Bristol
 British Salmson
 Brouhot
 Buchet
 Bücker
 Bugatti
 Burlat

C

 C.L.M.
 Construcciones Aeronáuticas SA – Spain
 Campini
 CANSA
 Carden Aero Engines — UK
 Caunter
 Ceskoslovenska Zbrojovka
 CFM International — US and France
 Chamberlin
 Charomskiy
 Chelomey
 Chevrolet — US
 Chotia
 Chrysler — US
 Cicaré Aeronáutica
 Cieslak
 Cirrus — UK
 Cisco Motors
 Ader
 Clément-Bayard
 Clerget-Blin — France
 Coatalen
 Colombo
 Comet
 Commonwealth Aircraft Corporation — Australia
 Compact Radial Engines – Canada
 CNA – Italy
 Conrad
 Continental
 Cosmos Engineering Company
 Coventry Victor — UK
 Crankless Engines Company
 Curtiss Aeroplane and Motor Company — US
 Curtiss-Wright — US
 Cuyuna Development Company — US

D

 D-Motor – Belgium 
 D. W. Onan — US
 Deschamps
 Daimler-Benz
 Darraq
 de Havilland — UK
 de Laval
 Deicke
 Delafontaine
 DeltaHawk — US
 Aeromotor
 Diesel Air
 Doble-Besler
 Dobrynin
 Dongan Engine Manufacturing Company – China
 Douglas
 Douglas — UK
 Dreher
 Duesenberg
 Duthiel-Chambers
 Dux
 Dyna-Cam

E

 EADS — Europe
 Easton
 Ecofly
 Eggenfellner Aircraft
 Electravia
 Electric Aircraft Corporation
 Elektromechanische Werke
 Elizalde — Spain
 EMG
 Emrax
 Engine Alliance — US
 E.N.V.
 Eurojet
 Europrop

F

 F&S
 Ranger — US
 Fairdiesel
 Fairey
 Farcot
 Farina
 Farman Aviation Works — France
 Fiat — Italy
 Firewall Forward Aero Engines
 Flader
 Fletcher
 Ford Motor Company — US
 Ford of Britain — UK
 Franklin Engine Company — US

G

 Garrett AiResearch — US
 Garuff
 Gas Turbine Research Establishment — India
 GE Honda Aero Engines — US
 GE-Aviation — US
 General — US
 General Aircraft Ltd.
 General Electric
 General Electric/Rolls-Royce
 General Motors — US
 Goebel
 Giannini
 Geiger Engineering
 GKN Aerospace — UK
 Glushenkov — Russia/Soviet Union
 Gnome et Rhône — France
 le Rhone — France
 Gobron-Brillié
 Great Plains Aircraft Supply Company
 Green — UK
 Grégoire
 Grizodubov
 Guiberson — US
 Gyro Motor Company

H

 Hall-Scott
 Hall-Scott — US
 Hamilton Sundstrand
 Hart Engine Company
 Hartland Engine & Machine co
 Heath Aircraft Corp
 Heath-Henderson
 Heinkel-Hirth — Germany
 Walter — Germany
 Helwan
 Hendee
 Herman
 Hermes Engine Company
 Hewland
 Hexadyne
 Hiero Engines – Austria
 Hiller Aircraft
 Hindustan Aeronautics — India
 Hiro
 Hirth
 Hirth — Germany
 Hispano-Suiza — France
 Hispano-Suiza — Spain
 Hitachi — Japan
 HKS – Japan
 Hofer
 Holbrook Aero Supply
 Honeywell — US
 Hopkins & de Kilduchevsky
 Hudson
 Hurricane Motors, Inc

I

 I.Ae.
 Italian American Motor Engineering
 IHI
 Imperial Airplane Society
 Industria Aeronautică Română – Romania
 ITP – Spain
 IL
 International
 International Aero Engines – Multinational
 Irwin
 Isaacson
 Ishikawajima-Harima Heavy Industries — Japan
 Isotov
 Isotta Fraschini — Italy
 Italian American Motor Engineering – Italy
 Ivchenko-Progress — Ukraine/Soviet Union

J

 J.A.P.
 Almen
 J.A.P. – UK
 Jabiru Aircraft — Australia
 Jacobs — US
 Jalbert-Loire
 Jameson
 Janowski
 Roché
 Jendrassik
 Johnson
 JLT Motors
 JPX – France
 Junkers — Germany
 Junkers

K

 König
 Kalep
 Kawasaki Heavy Industries Aerospace Company — Japan
 Kawasaki Heavy Industries
 Keikaufer
 Kemp
 Ken Royce — US
 Kessler
 KHD
 Kimball
 King-Bugatti
 Kinner — US
 Kirkham
 Klimov — Russia/Soviet Union
 Klöckner-Humboldt-Deutz — Germany
 Knox
 Koerting
 Kolesov
 Konrad
 Korting
 Kostovich
 Kroeber
 Kuznetsov — Russia/Soviet Union

L

 Lanitz Aviation
 Lawrance — US
 Le Rhône — France
 LeBlond Aircraft Engine Corporation — US
 Lee
 Lenape
 Les Long Long Harlequin
 Lessner
 LHTEC — US
 Liberty
 Light
 Limbach Flugmotoren — Germany
 Limbach
 LMC – China
 Lincoln Motor — US
 Lincoln
 Lockheed
 LOM Praha (Letecke Opravny Malesice, Praha)
 Loravia
 Lorraine-Dietrich — France
 Lotarev
 Lotarev — Russia/Soviet Union (see Ivchenko-Progress)
 Loughead Aircraft Mfg Co
 LSA-Engines
 Lucas
 Lycoming
 Lyulka — Russia/Soviet Union
 LZ Design

M

 MacClatchie
 Macomber Avis Engine Co
 MAN-Rolls-Royce
 Manfred Weiss
 Manly
 Mantovani
 Marchetti
 Marcmotor
 Marlin-Rockwell
 Marquardt Corporation
 Martin Motors Co
 Maru
 Maximotor
 Maybach — Germany
 Mayo
 McCulloch Motors — US
 McDonnell
 McDowell
 Mead
 Mekker
 Menasco Motor Company — US
 Mercedes
 Mercedes-Benz — Germany
 Métallurgique
 Meteor
 Meteormotor
 Metropolitan-Vickers
 Metropolitan-Vickers — UK
 Metz
 Michigan Aero-Engine Corporation
 Microturbo — France
 Miese
 Mikulin — Russia/Soviet Union
 Mikulin-Stechkin
 Milwaukee Tank
 Mistral Engine Company – Switzerland
 Mitsubishi Aircraft Company — Japan
 Modena Avio Engines
 Lambert Engine Division
 Morehouse
 Mors
 Motorav Industria
 Motor Sich — Ukraine
 Oberursel — Germany
 Motorlet
 Mozhaiskiy
 MTR
 MTR (MTU/Turbomeca/Rolls-Royce) — Europe
 MTU Aero Engines — Germany
 Mudry
 MTH Racing engines
 Murray-Willat
 MWfly

N

 N.A.G.
 N.E.C.
 Nagel
 Nakajima Aircraft Company — Japan
 D. Napier & Son — UK
 National Aerospace Laboratory of Japan
 National
 Nelson
 New Britain Machine Company
 Nihonnainenki
 Noel Penny Turbines – UK
 Normalair-Garrett
 Northrop
 Norton
 NST-Machinenbau

O

 Oberursel
 Orenda Engines — Canada
 Orlo
 Otto-Flugzeugwerke – Germany

P

 Packard — US
 Palmer Motor Co
 Panhard & Levassor
 Parker
 Parma Technik sro
 Parodi
 Pegasus Aviation (NZ) Ltd — New Zealand
 Peterlot
 Phillips
 Piaggio-Lycoming (United States and Italy)
 Piaggio — Italy
 Pieper
 Pierce
 Pipe
 Pobjoy Airmotors — UK
 Poinsard
 Polish Engines — Poland
 Porsche
 Potez — France
 Power Jets Ltd. — UK
 PowerJet — Russia
 Poyer
 Praga — Czech Republic
 Praha-Jinonice — Czech Republic
 Praha-Liben — Czech Republic
 Pratt & Whitney Canada — Canada
 Pratt & Whitney — US
 Price Induction — France
 Pulch
 Pulsar
 PZI — Poland
 PZL — Poland

Q
 Quick Motors Co

R

 Radne Motor AB
 Rapp-Motorenwerke GmbH — Germany
 Rasmussen
 Rausenberger
 Raven Redrives
 RBVZ
 Reaction Motors — US
 Rearwin
 Rectimo
 Redrup
 RED Aircraft GmbH  – Germany
 Régnier Engines – France
 Reid Gas Engine Co — US
 Renault — France
 R.E.P.
 RFB
 Rheinmetall-Borsig
 Ricardo
 Ricardo-Halford — UK
 Righter — US
 Roberts Motor Co
 Rockwell International — US
 Rocky Mountain
 Rolls-Royce Limited — UK
 Rolls-Royce North America — US
 Rolls-Royce plc — UK
 Rolls-Royce/SNECMA
 Rolls-Royce/Turbomeca
 Rotax — Austria
 Rotec Aerosport — Australia
 Rotex Electric
 RotorWay International — US
 Rotron Power Ltd
 Rover Company
 Royal Aircraft Factory — UK
 RRJAEL
 Rumpler
 Ryan Aeronautical Corp

S

 Saab AB — Sweden
 SAHA (Iran aviation) — Iran  
 SACMA
 Salmson — France
 NPO Saturn — Russia
 Schmidding — Germany
 Scott
 Seld
 SEPR
 SERMEL
 Shenyang — China
 Shvetsov — Russia/Soviet Union
 Siemens AG
 Siddeley-Deasy — UK
 Siemens AG — Germany
 Siemens-Halske — Germany
 Silnik
 Simms
 Skoda Works — Czech Republic
 Skymotors
 SMA Engines
 Smalley
 SME Aircraft Engine
 Smith
 SNECMA — France
 Sodemo Moteurs
 Solar Aircraft Company — US
 Soloviev — Russia/Soviet Union
 Subaru — Japan
 Speer
 Sperry
 Star
 Statax
 Straughan
 Studebaker-Waterman
 Studebaker — US
 Sturtevant
 Sunbeam Motor Car Company — UK
 Superior Air Parts
 Svenska Flygmotor — Sweden
 Szekely Aircraft & Engine Co. — US

T

 Take Off GmbH
 Technopower
 Techspace Aero — Belgium
 Teledyne Continental Motors — US
 Thaheld
 Scott — UK
 Thermo-Jet Standard Inc.
 Thielert — Germany
 Thomas Aeromotor Co Inc
 Thorotzkai
 Thunder Engines Inc.
 Tips
 Tips & Smith
 TNCA
 Tokyo Gasu Denki — Japan
 Trace Engines — US
 Train
 Tumansky — Russia/Soviet Union 
 Turbo-Union — Germany
 Turbomeca
 Turboméca/HAL
 Turbomecanica — Romania
 Turkish Aerospace Industries — Turkey

U

 Ufimtsev
 ULPower — Belgium
 Union Gas Engine Co

V

 Van Blerck Engine Co
 Vaxell
 Vedeneyev
 Velie Motors Corporation — US
 Verner Motor — Czech Republic
 Vernier
 Viale
 VIJA
 Viking
 Villiers-Hay
 Vittorazi Motors
 Vivinus
 Volvo Aero — Sweden
 von Behren
 Voronezh Mechanical Plant — Russia

W

 Walter
 Walter Engines — Czech Republic
 Wankel AG
 Warbirds-engines (Cesky znalecky institut s.r.o.)
 Warner Aircraft — US
 WASAG
 Welch
 Wells & Adams
 Werner
 West Engineering
 Western
 Westinghouse Electric Corporation — US
 Whitehead
 Wickner
 Wiley Post
 Wilksch
 Krautter
 Robinson
 Williams
 Williams International — US
 Wisconsin Motor Manufacturing Company
 Wolseley Motors — UK
 Wright Aeronautical
 Wright Company
 Wright-Gypsy
 Wright-Hisso
 Wright-Morehouse
 Wright-Siemens
 Wright-Tuttle

X

 XAEC — China
 XCOR Aerospace

Y

 Yamaha Motor Corporation — Japan
 York

Z

 Zanzottera Technologies — Italy
 Zlin
 Zoche
 Zündapp

References

Notes

Bibliography

 Cliche, Andre: Ultralight Aircraft Shopper's Guide 8th Edition Cybair Limited Publishing, 2001. 

 Gunston, Bill. World Encyclopaedia of Aero Engines. 1st edition. Cambridge, England. Patrick Stephens Limited, 1986
 Gunston, Bill. World Encyclopaedia of Aero Engines. 2nd edition. Cambridge, England. Patrick Stephens Limited, 1989. 

 Kay, Anthony L. Turbojet: History and Development 1930–1960: Volume 2: USSR, USA, Japan, France, Canada, Sweden, Switzerland, Italy, Czechoslovakia and Hungary. Marlborough, Wiltshire: Crowood Press, 2007 
 Kotelnikov, Vladimir. Russian Piston Aero Engines. Marlborough, Wiltshire. The Crowood Press Ltd. 2005. .

Lumsden, Alec. British Piston Engines and their Aircraft. Marlborough, Wiltshire: Airlife Publishing, 2003. 
Lumsden, Alec. British Piston Engines and their Aircraft. Marlborough, Wiltshire: Airlife Publishing, 1994. 

 Hartmann Gérard. "Les moteurs Anzani". PDF file
Nowarra, Heinz J.. Die Deutsche Luftruestung 1933–1945 Vol.4 – Flugzeugtypen MIAG-Zeppelin. Bernard & Graefe Verlag. 1993. Koblenz.  (Gesamtwerk),  (Band 4)
Hartmann, Gerard. LES MOTEURS D’AVIATION RENAULT.(.pdf)
Brew, Alec. Sunbeam Aero-Engines. Airlife Publishing Ltd.. 1998. Shrewsbury. 
Kotelnikov, Vladimir. Russian Piston Aero Engines. The Crowood Press Ltd.. 2005. Marlborough. 
Taylor, John W. R.. Jane's All the World's Aircraft 1982–83. Jane's Publishing Company. London. 1983. 
Hartmann, Gustave. [Moteurs de Légende.pdf]
Hartmann, Gustave. [Les moteurs d’aviation BURLAT.pdf]
Miguel Vidal, Ricardo (El Motor de Aviación de la A a la Z) Aeroteca, 2012

Aircraft engine manufacturers
Aircraft engine
Aircraft engine manufacturers